Johnny Sheffield (born John Matthew Sheffield Cassan, April 11, 1931 – October 15, 2010) was an American child actor who, between 1939 and 1947, portrayed Boy in the Tarzan film series and, between 1949 and 1955, played Bomba the Jungle Boy.

Early life
Sheffield was born John Matthew Sheffield Cassan on April 11, 1931, in Pasadena, California, the second child of actor Reginald Sheffield and Louise Van Loon (January 21, 1905 – April 14, 1987). His older sister was Mary Alice Sheffield Cassan and his younger brother was William Hart Sheffield Cassan (actor Billy Sheffield). His father was himself a former juvenile performer when he came to the United States from his native England. His mother, a native of New York City, was a Vassar College graduate with a liberal arts education who loved books and lectured widely.

In 1938, Sheffield became a child star after he was cast in the juvenile lead of a West Coast production of the highly successful Broadway play On Borrowed Time, which starred Dudley Digges and featured Victor Moore as Gramps. Sheffield played the role of Pud, a long role for a child. He later went to New York as a replacement and performed the role on Broadway.

Tarzan and other films
The following year, his father read an article in The Hollywood Reporter that asked, "Have you a Tarzan Jr. in your backyard?" He believed he did and set up an interview. MGM was searching for a suitable youngster to play the adopted son of Tarzan in its next jungle movie with stars Johnny Weissmuller and Maureen O'Sullivan. When he was 7 years old, Sheffield was taken to an audition where Weissmuller chose him over more than 300 juvenile actors interviewed for the part of "Boy" in Tarzan Finds a Son! (1939). Newspaper articles at the time mentioned erroneously that Sheffield was only 5 years old. In that same year, Sheffield appeared in the Busby Berkeley movie musical Babes in Arms with Mickey Rooney and Judy Garland, classmates of his at the studio school.

He appeared with many other performers over the years, including Jeanette MacDonald, Pat O'Brien, Cesar Romero, Ronald Reagan and Beverly Garland. He played the childhood version of the title character in Knute Rockne, All American, perhaps the most prestigious film in which he had a role.

Sheffield played Boy in three Tarzan movies at MGM, and in another five after the star, Weissmuller, and production of the movie series moved to RKO.  Brenda Joyce played Jane in the last three Tarzan movies in which Sheffield appeared.

Bomba and Bantu
After he outgrew the role of Boy, the teenaged Sheffield went on to star in his own jungle movie series for Allied Artists. The first entry in this series, Bomba, the Jungle Boy was released in 1949 with co-star Peggy Ann Garner. In all, he appeared as Bomba 12 times, more than any other character he portrayed. Sheffield retired from films at age 24 after starring in his twelfth Bomba film in 1955 ("Lord of the Jungle").

He then made a pilot for a television series, Bantu the Zebra Boy, which was created, produced, and directed by his father, Reginald Sheffield. Although the production values were high compared to other TV jungle shows of the day, a sponsor was not found and the show was not taken up as a weekly series. In his later years, Sheffield sold bootlegged copies of the pilot to collectors on videotape.

Post-Hollywood careers
Sheffield decided to leave the industry and enrolled in college to further his education. He lived and worked for a time in Arizona. He married Patricia Sheffield in 1959 in Yuma, Arizona. The couple had three children: Patrick, Stewart, and Regina.

After leaving show business, Sheffield completed a business degree at UCLA. Turning his attention to other fields, he involved himself variously in farming, real estate and construction. For a time, he was a representative for the Santa Monica Seafood Company importing lobsters from Baja California in Mexico.

In his later years Johnny Sheffield lived in Southern California where he wrote articles about his Hollywood years and sold copies of the TV pilot Bantu, the Zebra Boy on video.

Death
Sheffield's wife, Patty, said that he fell from a ladder while pruning a palm tree. Though his injuries seemed minor, he died of a heart attack four hours later on October 15, 2010, in Chula Vista, California, aged 79.

Filmography

References

Bibliography
 Best, Marc. Those Endearing Young Charms: Child Performers of the Screen (South Brunswick and New York: Barnes & Co., 1971), pp. 235–239.
 Holmstrom, John. The Moving Picture Boy: An International Encyclopaedia from 1895 to 1995, Norwich, Michael Russell, 1996, pp. 175–176.
 Dye, David. Child and Youth Actors: Filmography of Their Entire Careers, 1914-1985. Jefferson, NC: McFarland & Co., 1988, pp. 213.

External links

 "Matt's Bomba the Jungle Boy Movie Guide"

1931 births
2010 deaths
20th-century American male actors
Male actors from Los Angeles
American male film actors
American male child actors
University of California, Los Angeles alumni